All The Falsest Hearts Can Try is a full-length album by Centro-Matic, released in 2000.

Critical reception
Texas Monthly wrote that the band's "indie-rock allegiances remain strong enough that many songs here are actually oblique, bittersweet meditations on the mythology of those allegiances." NME called the album "yet more rough-hewn genius-in-the-making from the same American heartlands that threw up the likes of The Flaming Lips and Uncle Tupelo." The Chicago Tribune called it "brilliantly raw," writing: "Here is a group of musicians whose talent and experience pulls them toward perfection, though they'll happily sacrifice technical recording quality for musical quantity." MTV wrote that "the sonic mudbath, along with Centro-matic's deliberate bush-league musicianship, exquisitely compliments [Will] Johnson's songs, a twangy mix of Crazy Horse raunch and sweet acoustic balladeering."

Track listing 

 Cool That You Showed Us How
 The Blisters May Come
 Call the Legion in Tonight
 In the Strategy Room
 Huge in Every City
 Saving a Free Seat
 Save Us, Tothero
 Most Everyone Will Find
 Gas Blowin’ Out of Our Eyes
 Hercules Now!
 Magic Cyclops
 Would Go Over
 Members of The Show ‘em How It’s Done
 Aerial Spins/Nautical Wilderness

Personnel 
 Will Johnson - vocals, guitars
 Scott Danbom - vocals, keyboards, violin
 Mark Hedman - bass
 Matt Pence - drums

References

External links 
 Official site

Centro-Matic albums
2000 albums